KNIC-DT (channel 17) is a television station licensed to Blanco, Texas, United States, broadcasting the Spanish-language UniMás network to the San Antonio area. It is owned and operated by TelevisaUnivision alongside Univision outlet KWEX-DT (channel 41). Both stations share studios on Network Boulevard in Northwest San Antonio, while KNIC's transmitter is located on Hogan Drive in Timberwood Park. Although Blanco is geographically within the Austin market, that city has its own UniMás station, KTFO-CD.

History
KNIC-DT's history traces back to the March 1991 sign-on of K17BY, a low-power television station that San Antonio-based Clear Channel Communications (now iHeartMedia) was issued a construction permit to build on March 23, 1988; operating on UHF channel 17, Clear Channel sold the station in March 1991 to Nicolas Communications. In November 1997, the station changed its calls to KNIC-LP (in reference to its owners); Nicolas Communications sold KNIC-CA in November 2001 (the station received approval to upgrade its license to Class A status that same month) to Univision Communications, a sale that was completed in January 2002; that month, it became a charter affiliate of Univision's secondary network, TeleFutura (which relaunched as UniMás on January 7, 2013).

Univision had applied for a license to build a full-power television station in 2000 on UHF channel 52 in Blanco; after the Federal Communications Commission awarded Univision the license at auction, Univision requested that the FCC move the allocation to UHF channel 17; the request was granted in February 2003. KNIC-TV was founded on July 13, 2005. The formal application for KNIC-TV called for Univision to either move KNIC-CA to another channel, or to shut it down outright, KNIC-CA moved to channel 34 under special temporary authorization, before it ceased operations on September 28, 2006. KNIC-DT was one of the few television stations to have been built and signed on by Univision Communications.

Technical information

Subchannels
The station's digital signal is multiplexed:

Analog-to-digital conversion
Because it was granted an original construction permit after the FCC finalized the DTV allotment plan on April 21, 1997 , the station did not receive a companion channel for a digital television station. KNIC-TV discontinued regular programming on its analog signal, over UHF channel 17, on June 12, 2009. The station "flash-cut" its digital signal into operation UHF channel 18, using PSIP to display the station's virtual channel as its former UHF analog channel 17.

References

External links

Television channels and stations established in 2006
UniMás network affiliates
Ion Mystery affiliates
Laff (TV network) affiliates
KNIC-DT
Spanish-language television stations in Texas
2006 establishments in Texas